The Eask Tower is a solid stone tower on the top of Carhoo Hill, in County Kerry, Ireland, over-looking Dingle harbour.

Description

Eask Tower was built in 1847 in order to guide the ships and boats into the mouth of the blind harbour. The wooden hand pointing from the Tower, guides the boats to their destination. It is crowned with the 19th century's mariners beacon and a World War II look-out post. This is because the mouth of Dingle Harbour is a "blind" mouth, and this beacon told sailors to let their sails down, enabling them to lose speed and to round the harbour mouth safely.

The Tower is of solid stone. The tower was originally , but around the year 1900, the old hand was removed and an extra  of stone was added to its height. A new hand was placed, roughly at the beginning of the extension.

The panoramic views seen from Carhoo Hill include a large proportion of the Dingle Peninsula and beyond. For example, the Blasket Islands, Slea Head, Ventry, Dingle Harbour, the Iveragh Peninsula, Skellig Rocks, and two of Ireland's highest mountains - Carrauntoohil and Mount Brandon.

References

Buildings and structures in County Kerry
Towers in the Republic of Ireland
Towers completed in 1847
1847 establishments in Ireland